Assault on Nightwyrm Fortress is the third part of a three-part series of adventures belonging to the 4th edition Dungeons & Dragons concept of Points of Light, a loosely connected and open-ended setting designed to allow modules and Dungeon Masters created materials to be seamlessly integrated into either a single, largely unmapped fantasy world or a Dungeon Master custom made setting. The adventure, written by Bruce R. Cordell and Shawn Merwin, was published in March 2009 by Wizards of the Coast. The adventure is designed for character of levels 17-20 and the module code "P" stands for Paragon Tier. The adventure is largely set in the Shadowfell, an alternate plane of death and gloom mirroring the mortal realm.

Contents
A 32-page adventure book one booklet
A 64-page adventure book two booklet
A full-color poster map
A light cardboard portfolio

Publication history
The adventure was designed by Bruce R. Cordell and Shawn Merwin, and was published in March 2009. Cover art was by Jesper Ejsing, with interior art by Eric Belisle, Matias Topia, Todd Lockwood, and Vincent Dutrait. The product was re-released as a PDF in June 2014.

References

Bibliography
Bruce R. Cordell and Shawn Merwin. Assault on Nightwyrm Fortress (Wizards of the Coast, 2009).

External links
Wizards of the Coast product page
DMs Guild product page
P3 Assault on Nightwyrm Fortress Map Gallery
P3 Assault on Nightwyrm Fortress Art Gallery
P3 Assault on Nightwyrm Fortress Excerpts 

Dungeons & Dragons modules
Role-playing game supplements introduced in 2009